Serhiy Lyulka (born 22 February 1990 in Kyiv, in the Ukrainian SSR of the Soviet Union - in present-day Ukraine) is a professional Ukrainian football defender who plays for Metalist Kharkiv.

Career
He is a product of FC Dynamo Kyiv football academy.

Honours
Metalist Kharkiv
Ukrainian Second League: 2020-21

Ukraine U19
 UEFA European Under-19 Championship: 2009

External links
 
 
 
 
 Profile at FC Dynamo
 Slovan Liberec profile

1990 births
Living people
Footballers from Kyiv
Association football defenders
Expatriate footballers in the Czech Republic
FC Dynamo-2 Kyiv players
FC Dynamo-3 Kyiv players
FC Slovan Liberec players
FC Hoverla Uzhhorod players
FC Chornomorets Odesa players
FC Desna Chernihiv players
FC Lviv players
FC Metalist Kharkiv players
Ukrainian Premier League players
Ukrainian First League players
Ukrainian Second League players
Czech First League players
Ukrainian expatriate footballers
Ukrainian expatriate sportspeople in the Czech Republic
Ukrainian footballers
Ukraine under-21 international footballers
Ukraine youth international footballers